Turbonilla belotheca is a species of sea snail, a marine gastropod mollusk in the family Pyramidellidae, the pyrams and their allies.

Description
The shell grows to a length of 14 mm.

Distribution
This species occurs in the following locations:
 Caribbean Sea
 Gulf of Mexico
 Lesser Antilles : Virgin Islands, Barbados

References

External links
 To Biodiversity Heritage Library (8 publications)
 To Encyclopedia of Life
 To USNM Invertebrate Zoology Mollusca Collection
 To ITIS
 To World Register of Marine Species

belotheca
Gastropods described in 1889